Innocent Thing (lit. "Thorn") is a 2014 South Korean romantic thriller film directed by Kim Tae-kyun, starring Jang Hyuk and Jo Bo-ah.

Plot
Joon-ki (Jang Hyuk) was once a former rugby athlete and is currently a popular physical education teacher at an all-girls' high school. His pregnant wife Seo-yeon (Sunwoo Sun) is due to give birth to their first child imminently. Although he's used to playful advances from pubescent students, things take a dangerous turn when Young-eun (Jo Bo-ah) falls hard for her teacher and daringly confesses her feelings for him. Amid growing rumors, he is soon consumed with guilt and attempts to end the relationship. However Young-eun's pure crush slowly turns to obsession. She starts to regard everyone related with Joon-ki as obstacles, and the farther he keeps her away, the bolder her obsession and madness grows.

Cast

Jang Hyuk as Kim Joon-ki
Jo Bo-ah as Ha Young-eun
Sunwoo Sun as Seo-yeon
Lee Do-ah as Min-joo
Do Gwang-won as Seok-jin
Jang Seo-kyeong as Joo-hee
Shin Cheol-jin as school custodian
Park Jin-young as Jang-in, Joon-ki's father-in-law
Do Yong-gu as gynecologist
Wang Tae-eon as principal
Kim Kyeong-sik as Teacher Park
Han Hee-jung as housekeeper
Son Hee-seon as Joon-ki's mother-in-law
Yoo Ji-yeon as Cheo-hyeong, Joon-ki's sister-in-law 
Kim Won-sik as Dong-seo 
Yoon Bok-in as OB/Gyn nurse
Baek Eun-joo as student council president
Kim Ye-eun as Ye-eun 
Han Seul-gi as Seul-gi 
Lee Sang-mi as Sang-mi 
Park Jeong-hee as Jeong-hee 
Lee Sae-bom as Sae-bom 
Woo Do-im as Do-im 
Park Gyu-ri as Gyu-ri 
Kang Do-eun as Joo-hee's mother
Jeong Joon-yeong as Teacher Jeong 
Choi Won-seok as Won-seok 
Heo Ji-hye as new ward nurse 
Kim Mi-kyeong as neonatal nurse 
Oh Ui-taek as male student 
Lee Yeon-joon as "kiss" man
Park Joon-seo as man in TV drama
Kim Bo-ryeong as woman in TV drama

Production
The film reunited director Kim Tae-kyun and actor Jang Hyuk for the first time in thirteen years since Volcano High (2001). Kim first encountered the screenplay in 2007 at a competition, and he was won over right away, captivated by the blurred lines between love and obsession. He called the film "an experiment" due to its eclectic mix of suspense, horror, melodrama and romance, and that his use of cinematography and camera techniques were essential in delivering the "feeling of being trapped." Wanting the schoolgirl character to embody both innocence and pure sex appeal, Kim auditioned 250 actresses, before casting Jo Bo-ah in her big screen debut.

The early working title was Strawberry Milk, a drink which Jo's character has a fixation on. It was changed to Thorn because Kim said, "There is nothing sweet and soft about the movie like strawberry flavored milk. Only sharpness like a thorn exists. It represents something difficult."

Filming began on September 14, 2013, at Jijok Middle School in Daejeon. Shooting wrapped on November 10, 2013.

Box office
Innocent Thing was released on April 10, 2014. It drew 121,292 viewers on its opening day.

References

External links
 

2014 films
2010s erotic films
2014 psychological thriller films
2010s romantic thriller films
Erotic romance films
2010s erotic thriller films
Films about stalking
Films directed by Kim Tae-kyun
South Korean erotic thriller films
South Korean romantic thriller films
2010s South Korean films